Mapleworth Murders is an American comedy-mystery series. It stars Paula Pell, John Lutz, J. B. Smoove and Hayley Magnus. Lorne Michaels and Seth Meyers serve as executive producers. It premiered on August 10, 2020, on Quibi.

Premise
A murder-mystery writer investigates homicides in her small town, with each episode featuring guest victims and suspects, to answer the question: why are there so many murders in one small town?

Production

Development
Lutz and Pell created the series as a parody of Murder, She Wrote following a suggestion from Lutz's wife, fellow comedian Sue Galloway. In June 2019, it was announced Pell and Lutz would star, write and executive produce the series, with Lorne Michaels and Seth Meyers serving as producers under their Broadway Video and Sethmaker Shoemeyers banner, alongside Universal Television for Quibi. In December 2019, it was announced Claire Scanlon would direct the series.

Due to the format of Quibi, each episode was 10 minutes, but they were developed as three-part story arcs to allow the series to later be reformatted to a traditional 30-minute, three-act comedy series.

Casting
In December 2019, J. B. Smoove and Hayley Magnus joined the cast as series regulars, with Fred Armisen, Tim Meadows, Maya Rudolph, Patton Oswalt, Jack McBrayer, D'Arcy Carden, Pam Murphy, Ben Warheit, Annie Mumolo, Ike Barinholtz, Mary Holland, James Anderson, and Drew Tarver in recurring capacity and Tina Fey, Chris Parnell, Andy Samberg, Wanda Sykes, Terry Crews, Nicole Byer and Jimmy Carlson to guest star.

Cast and characters

Main
 Paula Pell as Abigail Mapleworth
 Hayley Magnus as Heidi
 John Lutz as Gilbert Pewntz
 J. B. Smoove as Chief Billy Bills

Guest
 James Anderson as Branda Bcbillan
 Fred Armisen as Brody Bcbillan/Belk
 Ike Barinholtz as Richard Belt
 Nicole Byer as Julia Squift
 D'Arcy Carden as Server
 Jimmy Carlson
 Terry Crews as Yoda
 Tina Fey as Martha
 Mary Holland
 Drew Tarver as Brent Davenport
 Jack McBrayer as Dink Choadler
 Tim Meadows as Andy Hapsburg
 Annie Mumolo as Paige Wellingtont
 Pam Murphy as Camille Canelli-Twat
 Patton Oswalt as Jerry Sprinks
 Chris Parnell as Ben Canelli
 Maya Rudolph as Broda Bcbillan
 Andy Samberg as Bran Bcbillan
 Wanda Sykes as Leigh Drain
 Ben Warheit as Ben Jr.

Episodes

Awards

References

External links
 

2020 American television series debuts
2020s American comedy television series
American comedy web series
Television series by Broadway Video
Television series by Universal Television
Quibi original programming